Bastawad  is a village in the southern state of Karnataka, India. It is located in the Belgaum taluk of Belgaum district in Karnataka.

Demographics
At the 2001 India census, Bastawad had a population of 6045 with 3095 males and 2950 females.

See also
 Belgaum
 Districts of Karnataka

References

External links
 http://Belgaum.nic.in/

Villages in Belagavi district